Rampur Halt railway station is a halt railway station on Sahibganj loop line under the Malda railway division of Eastern Railway zone. It is situated beside Rampur-Sahoor Road at Rampur in Lakhisarai district in the Indian state of Bihar.

References

Railway stations in Lakhisarai district
Malda railway division